The 2017–18 Baltic Men Volleyball League, known as Credit 24 Champions League for sponsorship reasons, was the 13th edition of the highest level of club volleyball in the Baltic states. Saaremaa, a new team formed in 2017, won on their debut as they defeated Pärnu in the final with the score 3–2.

Participating teams

The following teams took part in the 2017–18 edition of Baltic Men Volleyball League.

Venues and personnel

Main Tournament
All participating 14 clubs were playing according to the double round robin system.

|}
Updated to match(es) played on 11 March 2018. Source: Credit24 Champions League

Playoffs
The four winners of each series qualified to the Final Four, while the other four teams were eliminated.

Final four
Organizer: Saaremaa 
Venue: Kuressaare Sports Centre, Kuressaare, Estonia

Semifinals

|}

3rd place match

|}

Final

|}

Final ranking

Final four awards

Most Valuable Player
  Hindrek Pulk (Saaremaa) 
Best Setter
  Alexander Tusch (Saaremaa) 
Best Outside Hitters
  Tomaš Halanda (Saaremaa) 
  Märt Tammearu (Pärnu) 

Best Middle Blockers
  Harri Palmar (Pärnu) 
  Siim Ennemuist (Rakvere) 
Best Opposite Hitter
  Hindrek Pulk (Saaremaa) 
Best Libero
  Davis Melnis (Jēkabpils Lūši)

References
Credit24 Champions League 2017/2018 volley.ee

External links
Official website 

Baltic Men Volleyball League
Baltic Men Volleyball League
Baltic Men Volleyball League
Baltic Men Volleyball League
Baltic Men Volleyball League
Baltic Men Volleyball League
Baltic Men Volleyball League
Baltic Men Volleyball League
Baltic Men Volleyball League
Baltic Men Volleyball League